David Finbow (born 27 February 1968) is an English former professional snooker player from Worcester.

Career
In his career, he managed to beat players such as Ronnie O'Sullivan, Ken Doherty and James Wattana. Originally a soccer player, he was introduced to snooker by a neighbourhood friend. He attended Jarvis Collegiate Institute in Toronto for high school, where he became a star in his new sport for the Bulldogs, who began dominating the Toronto league in 1978. Throughout his career he reached five quarter-finals in ranking tournaments, as well as the last 16 of many events and he once looked as if he could get into the top 16 of the world rankings. However, his results in tournaments suffered, which was partly due to suffering from anxiety attacks which caused him to feel nauseated and unable to concentrate in a match. Finbow could not find a cure, and despite taking prescribed medication and trying a number of solutions it did not cure his anxiety attacks completely. After beating David Gray and Dave Harold to reach the last 16 of the 2001 UK Championship he was playing Ronnie O'Sullivan, but suffered a particularly bad anxiety attack, and was forced to retire the match at 0–8 down. After the match he expressed his distress and by the end of the 2002–2003 season he announced his retirement from the game altogether.

Performance and rankings timeline

References

External links
Profile on the Global Snooker Centre

English snooker players
Sportspeople from Worcester, England
Living people
1968 births